Private is a series of young-adult novels by American author Kate Brian, beginning with 2006's entry of the same name. The books chronicle the rise of ambitious teenager Reed Brennan, the series' narrator, as she becomes a member of her new school's elite dorm—composed of a glamorous yet disparate group of teens known as the Billings Girls. As the series progresses, several matters surrounding mystery, morality, and romance arise.

Thematically, moral ambiguity is a prominent feature of Brian's work. Extreme cases of loyalty and antagonism are personified in characters such as Noelle Lange and Ivy Slade—to degrees that are sometimes questioned or denounced by the narrator. However, it is often only after the details of another character's background have been revealed that Brennan can understand what motivates them, which will occasionally leave her conflicted in her judgments. The series has companion works, set in the past and the future, which are dedicated to further exploring character. These novels include the Private prequel collection, which focuses on various figures, and the spin-off series Privilege, which follows the resourceful but disturbed Ariana Osgood.

To convey the story's tone, the series' art team was composed of select individuals with backgrounds in teenage popular culture and youth-oriented fashion. As a recurring visual theme, each cover from the central story depicts three young women on front, with a fourth featured a slight distance apart on the opposite side.

Debuts of Private novels have appeared on the New York Times Best Seller list. The publisher has also released e-book editions of the series and its spin-off. In May 2009, a Web series based on the Private novels was announced. A film adaptation began production at Warner Bros. in 2016, but was subsequently cancelled during development.

Overview
The Private continuity is divided into three sets of novels: The original series, which covers present events; the spin-off Privilege, which takes place 1–2 years in the future; and the prequel collection, which is set during various points of the past.

The original series begins with the introduction of Reed Brennan, a savvy and ambitious honors student who enters the prestigious Easton Academy private school. Coming from a shaken family and a mundane everyday life, she is eager to explore the brand new setting that awaits her in Connecticut. Unexpectedly, the center of her fascination soon becomes a famed dorm known as Billings House and the posh girls who reside there—Noelle, Ariana, Kiran, and Taylor. In time, Reed pines to become a Billings Girl herself, and is faced with many tests and compromises along the way. As the series progresses, several additional characters and their histories are introduced and focused upon.

Production

Conception

Simon & Schuster backed Private with book displays in Barnes & Noble outlets and a promotional contest through CosmoGIRL! magazine, in which 20 winners would receive free copies of book #1. Brian has stated that the setting of the series was conceived by her editor at Simon & Schuster, while she herself chose a central focus. After a certain amount of consideration, the author decided that mystery would be the ideal center of her characters' environment.

Art team

The series' cover team was composed of individuals who have worked with teen idols and socialites. Graphic designer Julian Peploe—who previously worked on CD covers for the Pussycat Dolls, The Veronicas, and Brandy—is largely credited for the signature cover image depicting supposed antipathy between one girl and three others. Series photographer Roger Moenks had worked with Joss Stone prior to his being chosen to photograph the Private models. In addition, Mr. Moenks and co-photographer Laurent Alfieri had collaborated before working on Private, at some points taking photos of young businesswomen from around the world to illustrate a series of articles written by David Benaym for L'Officiel.

Stylist Christina Havemeyer has stated that when deciding what the models will wear, "I look for obviously what I think is going to be something that a teenage girl is going to gravitate toward." She has noted the significance of color and variety. "Mixing and matching is very important. . .you can buy something from the store that's brand new and you can mix it with your grandma's necklace from 1959. So it creates kind of a luxe, but young, youthful look."

Since premiering, the series has been worked on by other noted artists, including Alloy Entertainment's visual director, Andrea C. Uva.

Cover models
In mid-2009, the series' Web site revealed alternative covers for several of the previously released US editions. Of the original covers, the models appearing on the first book—who grace the next three installments as well—portray the following characters according to Kate Brian: Noelle (center), Ariana (left), Taylor (right), and Kiran (back cover). The identities of other characters to appear have largely been left unverified.

Characters

Private has an expansive cast and a regularly changing hierarchy. As conflicts ensue, the series is marked by exits, arrivals, and social ascensions. Consequently, characters who are on supporting status reach new heights, and characters who hold prominent positions are faced with a variety of descents, ranging from quiet to scandalous.

Reed Brennan
The collected, curious protagonist, Reed is a brown-haired girl from Pennsylvania who enters Easton Academy for her sophomore year on a scholarship  at the beginning of the first book. Her troubled family background and otherwise placid past makes her overly ambitious and docile when presented with exciting opportunities. Though gifted both academically and athletically, her first major aspiration at Easton is to get into Billings House, which holds the allure of great social privileges and respect. She manages to get the attention of the Billings Girls, and a series of initiations to test her credibility follows. She initially dates a rebellious boy named Thomas Pearson, who disappears in the first novel and is revealed to have died in the second. Later, she begins a longer romantic relationship with a fellow student named Josh Hollis. As the series progresses, she experiences several physical perils, emotional challenges, and personal surprises, leading her to realize that appearances can be deceiving.

Noelle Lange
Noelle is a brown-haired young woman who initially serves as 'leader' of the girls in Billings House. Fiercely loyal to her friends, she is the implied counterpart to Reed, being similarly skilled in lacrosse and soccer, and apparently coming from a shaken family of her own. However, her privileged upbringing tends to make her blunt and sometimes insensitive, as she enjoys intimidating other students as well as the Easton staff. She is shown to be overly self-confident to the point of arrogance, but very intelligent. According to some of her peers, she cannot live without drama in her life. Noelle possesses a long, red scar along her stomach, just above her hipbone from a childhood horseback riding accident. She has an unstable longtime romantic relationship with another senior named Dash McCafferty. As the series progresses, Noelle becomes Reed's best friend and ally. Later in the series, facts about Noelle's family are revealed and it is discovered that Noelle is Reed's paternal half-sister.

Ariana Osgood
Ariana is the quietest member of the group, possessing blue eyes, ethereal white-blond hair, and a penetrating stare. She is known for always having her nose in a book, and is considered to be Reed's first friend in Billings, as it was Ariana who introduced Reed to the others. Beneath her exterior, Ariana is eventually revealed to have darker issues as the series progresses. She becomes the lead character of the first prequel, Last Christmas, and the spin-off, Privilege.
 
Josh Hollis
 
Josh is a blond-curled Easton student who is known to be quiet and is also an artist who possesses keys to the frequented art cemetery. He soon becomes Reed's primary romantic interest. The two begin dating during Reed's first year at the school. However, Josh often shows his distaste towards the Billings Girls, and sometimes quarrels with Reed about her ties to Billings House. In Legacy Josh breaks up with Reed when he finds her with Dash. Then he starts to date Ivy Slade. By the end of Scandal, he and Reed are a couple again. However, halfway through Vanished Reed is forced to break up with Josh, because someone is holding Noelle hostage and is giving Reed tasks to win her life back. Josh is appalled at first, but then later realizes that it was the kidnappers doing and gets back together with Reed.

Kiran Hayes
The most glamorous Billings Girl, Kiran is a model with brownish-gold eyes, brown hair, and tan skin. She has extremely good sense in fashion, and is capable of turning people into superstar lookalikes. She is also known to be shallow and 'bratty' to others. Beneath the surface, Kiran is troubled by alcoholism, which can lead to repercussions for herself and the others. She becomes a secondary character following the completion of the series' first arc. She makes an appearance in the Privilege series, during which Ariana pushes a drunken Kiran off a bridge.

Taylor Bell
A brainy, sensitive member of the group who possesses messy dark blonde curls and blue eyes; Reed's first impression of her is of a "cherub." She claims to have a photographic memory, and possesses a sweeter and more innocent nature than that of her three friends, as she is often visibly sensitive to others' feelings. Like Kiran, Taylor becomes a secondary character following the completion of the series' first arc. In the third book, Taylor leaves Easton to go back to public school. It is later discovered in Paradise Lost that Taylor was intimidated into leaving Easton by Ariana.

Ivy Slade
A prominent antiheroine, Ivy Slade is a sassy and intelligent girl introduced in the fifth novel. During the series' second arc (books 5–8), she reveals a firm hostility toward all things associated with Billings House. She is described as a match for the Billings Girls in terms of beauty and glamour. However, she is the only character known to have declined an invitation to join the dorm. Eventually, Ivy and Reed form a truce in the interests of a common goal, leading to a friendship between the two. She finally fulfills her destiny and becomes a Billings Girl later in the series, at Reed's request.

Halls of residence
Easton Academy is unofficially distinguished by a caste-like environment, socially divided by lower-, middle-, and upper-class dormitories.

Billings House
An upperclassmen dorm for girls, recognized as the most prestigious of all houses in the series. Acceptance into Billings is granted by invitation only. The building carries a mixed reputation throughout the books; members are typically depicted as being socially and academically privileged, but several of the Billings Girls are also shown to engage in varying illicit and snobbish practices. Most are known for their beautiful physical appearances and their reckless partying. Furthermore, some are not above resorting to methods such as bribery, blackmail, and treachery.

At the end of Suspicion, when Noelle and Reed are arriving back at Easton after break, Billings House is gone.

Bradwell Hall
Bradwell is a dorm for freshmen and sophomore girls. In the first book, it is where Reed Brennan lives before being admitted into Billings Hall. It is also where Missy Thurber, Kiki Rosen, Lorna Gross, Diana Waters, and Constance Talbot reside before their eventual move.

Ketlar House
Ketlar is a dorm said to house several coveted boys throughout the series. It is the dormitory for senior and junior boys where Josh Hollis and Gage Coolidge reside, where Thomas Pearson lived in Private and Last Christmas, and also where Dash McCafferty lived in the first four books.

Drake House
Drake is a dormitory for upperclassmen boys, nicknamed "Dreck" because it is supposedly where all the unsavory boys at Easton live. Kiran Hayes at one point has a fling with a boy from Drake House and Reed is forced to publicly break up with him (for Kiran) on instruction of the other Billings girls. Marc Alberro, whom Reed becomes friends with in Ambition, lives here.

Pemberly Hall
Junior/Senior girls who fall short of reaching Billings reside in Pemberly. When Reed is kicked out of Billings in Revelation, she gets a single in Pemberly, right next to her former nemesis Ivy Slade.

Parker
Dormitory for upperclassmen girls, where some former Billings House girls reside after the destruction of their old home.

Hull Hall
Hull Hall is where members of staff reside. It is nicknamed "Hell Hall" by the students.

Gwendolyn Hall
Gwendolyn Hall was the original class building at Easton. It is now a condemned building mainly used for hook-ups. In Private, Reed and Thomas often meet there. It is burned down at the end of Legacy by the Billings Girls and other students who used a tunnel in its basement to sneak out to the Legacy party.

Themes
The central themes in the Private series revolve around sociological matters such as conformity and elitism—particularly as they pertain to an outsider during the coming of age period. As Reed strives to become a Billings Girl, she enters a world of moral ambiguity that raises questions concerning how far the characters will go in matters of ambition and loyalty.

Book releases

With the exception of the first Private novel, which debuted in Canada on June 27, 2006, releases of the US and Canadian editions have been simultaneous, generally followed by releases in the United Kingdom.

2008 saw the release of five books in the saga: three in the original series, the first prequel, and the first installment of the spin-off. Five novels were also announced for 2010: two in the original series, two in the spin-off series, and the second book in the Private prequel collection. In addition to release dates, the tables below account for New York Times Best Seller list peak numbers.

Prequels

Spin-off

Reception
The series has been mostly well received among Brian's fanbase, while critical response has generally ranged from positive to mixed. After covering the first book, a review for Publishers Weekly stated that readers would "no doubt eagerly await the next installment," but also cited issues with characterization in the series opening. Comments in this regard have normally claimed that Reed is the only character who is initially well-developed, with Publishers Weekly remarking that "the Billings Girls themselves are stereotypical, but Reed is more complex than most of this genre's narrators." This matter remained under scrutiny as the series moved on, with a review from School Library Journal being generally neutral, claiming that the continued series includes "characters and situations that are interesting yet familiar." Children's Literature praised Brian's writing style for presenting "a very easy read, broken up into small chapters that allow the quick pace to carry the reader through."

In a survey conducted via the Website polldaddy.com, readers of the Private series voted Reed Brennan their favorite Billings Girl. Conversely, a more critical review from School Library Journal claimed that in the first book, several elements of her personality were left underdeveloped, including her apparent lack of ability to "empathize at all with her mother's pain-killer addiction."

There has been controversy regarding Brian's grasp of the characters' names and physical appearances. Throughout the beginning of the series, when the character of Kiki is first introduced, her last name is Rosen. However, her name is later switched to Kiki Thorpe. Additionally, the eye color of certain characters, including Josh Hollis, Thomas Pearson, and Ivy Slade, changes throughout the series. A critic stated in a review for Amazon.com that the appearances of many of the secondary characters, with the exception of a few, changes "with each new installment."

Throughout the majority of 2008, Brian posted first-chapter previews on her MySpace blog, which were regularly met with positive feedback. Beginning in December, the previews were moved to the series' official Website.

Multi-media

Trailer
To promote the release of Inner Circle, Simon & Schuster teamed with the New York Film Academy in 2007 to produce an Internet-released live-action trailer for the novel. Written, produced, and directed by John Paschall, the short film is archived on Simon & Schuster's Website.

Fan campaign
In 2008, fans of Private began campaigning for the series to be adapted into a television program or feature-length film. This appeal was bolstered by the fact that the series' distributor, Simon & Schuster, is owned by CBS Corporation, and thereby associated with CBS and the CW Television Network. On June 10, 2008, Kate Brian posted a link on her MySpace blog directing readers to a fan-organized petition regarding a proposed TV series or motion picture. Following this author referral, activity on the petition saw a fast and drastic increase.

Web series

In May 2009, a live-action Web series based on the Private novels was announced, with a scheduled summer debut. A contest was also revealed, allowing female readers the chance to audition for the role of Kiran Hayes. Additionally, it was announced that the series would adapt the first four books via 20 episodes, each with a standard length of four to six minutes.

Cancelled film adaptation
In 2016, a film adaptation of Private began production at Warner Bros., with Stacy Rukeyser attached as writer. When asked about the film in November 2020, Rukeyser replied that Warner Bros had decided not to move forward with the project.

References

Young adult novel series
Novels set in boarding schools
American young adult novels
Alloy Entertainment